County Sligo is a former county constituency in Ireland, represented in the House of Commons of the Parliament of the United Kingdom. It returned two Members of Parliament (MPs), elected by the bloc vote system of election.

Boundaries
This constituency comprised the whole of County Sligo, except the parliamentary borough of Sligo from 1801 to 1870. After the Sligo and Cashel Disfranchisement Act 1870, the borough ceased to have separate representation, and eligible voters were added to the roll for the county constituency.

From 1885 the constituency was divided into North Sligo and South Sligo.

Members of Parliament

Elections

Elections in the 1830s

Elections in the 1840s

 

Perceval was appointed a commissioner of the Treasury, causing a by-election.

Elections in the 1850s
Ffolliott resigned by accepting the office of Steward of the Chiltern Hundreds, causing a by-election.

Elections in the 1860s

Elections in the 1870s

Gore-Booth's death caused a by-election.

Elections in the 1880s

 

O'Conor's death caused a by-election.

References

The Parliaments of England by Henry Stooks Smith (1st edition published in three volumes 1844–50), 2nd edition edited (in one volume) by F.W.S. Craig (Political Reference Publications 1973)

Historic constituencies in County Sligo
Westminster constituencies in County Sligo (historic)
Constituencies of the Parliament of the United Kingdom established in 1801
Constituencies of the Parliament of the United Kingdom disestablished in 1885